Tino-Sven Sušić (born 13 February 1992) is a Bosnian professional footballer who plays as an attacking midfielder for Rudeš.

Sušić started his professional career at Hajduk Split, before joining Genk in 2016. In 2017–18, he had a loan spell with Maccabi Tel Aviv. He then moved to Antwerp in 2018. Later that year he signed with Venlo. After leaving Venlo in 2019, Sušić then joined Austrian Bundesliga club TSV Hartberg, where he played for half a year. In February 2020, he joined Bosnian Premier League club Sarajevo. Sušić left Sarajevo in August 2021.

A former Belgian youth international, he made his senior international debut for Bosnia and Herzegovina in 2014. Sušić represented the nation at their first major tournament, the 2014 FIFA World Cup.

Club career

Early career
Born in Sarajevo, Sušić emigrated with his family early in his life to Belgium. He started training with the second-tier Visé, before moving to the youth side of Genk. At the age of 16, he moved to Standard Liège. In August 2010, he was called up to the Belgium under-19 side, featuring in two matches as a substitute, playing a friendly match for Standard Liège first team as well. Not breaking through, he continued playing for the team's youth sides.

Hajduk Split
In June 2012 he joined Croatian side Hajduk Split on a four-year contract. He made his debut on 19 July at the age of 20 in a UEFA Europa League qualifier against Skonto. On 31 October, he scored his first goal against city rivals Split. Sušić won his first trophy with the club on 22 May 2013, by beating Lokomotiva in the Croatian Cup final.

In February 2015, Sušić signed a new contract with Hajduk expiring in June 2018.

Sušić won the Sportske novosti Yellow Shirt award for the 2015–16 season, which is given to the best player in the league.

Genk
On 29 August 2016, he rejoined his once youth club Genk in a transfer worth approximately €2 million. He made his first appearance for Genk against Standard Liège on 11 September. Sušić scored his first goal for the club against Athletic Bilbao in UEFA Europa League group game.

On 7 August 2017 Sušić joined Maccabi Tel Aviv on a one-year loan deal in order to get more minutes.

Antwerp
After falling to get regular first-team football, his loan spell at Maccabi Tel Aviv was ended in January 2018. Consequently, Sušić terminated his contract with Genk and signed for Antwerp until June 2019. He had to wait for over two months on his official debut, which came in a league game against St. Truiden.

Venlo
In July 2018, Sušić signed a one-year contract with Dutch club Venlo, with an option for additional year. He debuted in a competitive game on 11 August against Willem II. On 26 August, he scored his first goal for the club against Utrecht.

TSV Hartberg
On 19 October 2019, Sušić signed a one-year contract with Austrian club TSV Hartberg. After playing only two league matches for Hartberg, he was released by the club in January 2020.

Sarajevo
On 1 February 2020, Sušić joined Bosnian Premier League club Sarajevo, signing a two-year contract with the club. He made his official debut and scored his first official goal for Sarajevo in a 6–2 league win against Tuzla City on 22 February 2020. Sušić won his first league title with Sarajevo on 1 June 2020, though after the 2019–20 Bosnian Premier League season was ended abruptly due to the COVID-19 pandemic in Bosnia and Herzegovina and after which Sarajevo were by default crowned league champions for a second consecutive time.

In the 2020–21 season, he won his second trophy with the club, winning the Bosnian Cup after beating Borac Banja Luka in the final.

After playing a few games at the start of the 2021–22 season, Sušić decided to terminate his contract with Sarajevo and leave the club in August 2021.

Kuban Krasnodar
On 2 October 2021, Sušić signed with second-tier Russian Football National League club Kuban Krasnodar. On 17 March 2022, his contract was terminated by mutual consent.

Tabor Sežana
In April 2022, he joined Slovenian PrvaLiga side Tabor Sežana for the remainder of the 2021–22 season, utilizing the new transfer rules that allowed footballers playing in Russia to sign for other teams due to the Russian invasion of Ukraine.

International career
Holding multiple citizenship, Sušić was eligible to represent three nations on senior level: Belgium, Croatia and Bosnia and Herzegovina, having played for Belgium at various youth levels. In October 2013, he confirmed that he would play for Bosnia and Herzegovina.

He received his first senior call-up in February 2014, for a friendly game against Egypt, and debuted in that game on 5 March.

Later that year Sušić was named in Bosnia and Herzegovina's squad for the 2014 FIFA World Cup, which was the country's first major tournament. He made his competition debut against Nigeria on 22 June.

Personal life
Tino-Sven was born in Sarajevo to Bosniak father and Croat mother. He is the son of the former Yugoslavia international Sead Sušić and the nephew of Safet Sušić. His mother Irena hails from Podgora.

On 14 June 2019, Sušić married his long-time girlfriend Glenis Jankov.

Career statistics

Club

International

Honours
Hajduk Split
Croatian Cup: 2012–13

Maccabi Tel Aviv
Toto Cup: 2017–18

Sarajevo
Bosnian Premier League: 2019–20
Bosnian Cup: 2020–21

Individual
Awards
SN Yellow Shirt Award: 2015–16

References

External links
 

1992 births
Living people
Footballers from Sarajevo
Bosnia and Herzegovina emigrants to Belgium
Belgian people of Bosnia and Herzegovina descent
Belgian people of Croatian descent
Bosnia and Herzegovina people of Croatian descent
Bosnia and Herzegovina people of Bosniak descent
Croatian people of Bosniak descent
Association football midfielders
Belgian footballers
Belgium youth international footballers
Bosnia and Herzegovina footballers
Bosnia and Herzegovina international footballers
2014 FIFA World Cup players
C.S. Visé players
K.R.C. Genk players
Standard Liège players
HNK Hajduk Split players
Maccabi Tel Aviv F.C. players
Royal Antwerp F.C. players
VVV-Venlo players
TSV Hartberg players
FK Sarajevo players
FC Urozhay Krasnodar players
NK Tabor Sežana players
NK Rudeš players
Croatian Football League players
Belgian Pro League players
Israeli Premier League players
Eredivisie players
Austrian Football Bundesliga players
Premier League of Bosnia and Herzegovina players
Russian First League players
Slovenian PrvaLiga players

Belgian expatriate footballers
Bosnia and Herzegovina expatriate footballers
Expatriate footballers in Belgium
Expatriate footballers in Croatia
Expatriate footballers in Israel
Expatriate footballers in the Netherlands
Expatriate footballers in Austria
Expatriate footballers in Russia
Expatriate footballers in Slovenia
Bosnia and Herzegovina expatriate sportspeople in Belgium
Bosnia and Herzegovina expatriate sportspeople in Croatia
Bosnia and Herzegovina expatriate sportspeople in Israel
Bosnia and Herzegovina expatriate sportspeople in the Netherlands
Bosnia and Herzegovina expatriate sportspeople in Austria
Bosnia and Herzegovina expatriate sportspeople in Russia
Bosnia and Herzegovina expatriate sportspeople in Slovenia